Retrogressive thaw slumps (RTS), are a type of landslide that occur in the terrestrial Arctic's permafrost region of the circumpolar Northern Hemisphere when an ice-rich section thaws. RTSs develop quickly and can extend across several hectares modifying Arctic coastlines and permafrost terrain. They are the most active and dynamic feature of thermokarstthe collapse of the land surface as ground ice melts. They are thermokarst slope failures due to abrupt thawing of ice-rich permafrost or glaciated terrains. These horseshoe-shaped landslides contribute to the thawing of hectares of permafrost annually and are considered to be one of the most active and dynamic features of thermokarstthe "processes and landforms that involve collapse of the land surface as a result of the melting of ground ice." They are found in permafrost or glaciated regions of the Northern Hemispherethe Tibetan Plateau, Siberia, from the Himalayas to northern Greenland, and in northern Canada's Northwest Territories (NWT), the Yukon Territories, Nunavut, and Nunavik and in the American state of Alaska. The land began to sink, and the Batagaika Crater began to form in the 1960s, following clear-cutting of a section of forested area.

Development and formation

As ice-rich permafrost and glacial terrain thaws, the melting ground ice causes the land surface to collapse through a series of processes resulting in the formation of an irregular land surface, called thermokarst, composed of hummocks and hollows.

Retrogressive thaw slumps are the "most active geomorphic features" of thermokarst permafrost terrain". Permafrost dates back hundreds of thousands of years; thermokarst and its featuressuch as retrogressive thaw slumpswhich are slope failures, have been initiated by terrain disturbance associated with clear-cutting forests, the construction of seismic lines and roads.

The retrogressive thaw slump forms on massive ice or ice-rich permafrost, which is often covered in a layer of tundra vegetation under which a layer of peat may lie. The RTS surface is convex and is located on the shoulder of the hillslope.

The most thawing occurs on south- and west-facing slopes. Ballantyne describes how, as scarp ice thaws it causes rapidly-evolving retrogressive slope failure or slumping. This landslide "exposes a fresh face" of ice-rich permafrost. As thawing takes place, the ice-rich, steep, erosional headscarp retreats as it collapses. An active layer of basal sediment accumulates flowing down a low-gradient slump floor. This flows downslope as it "collapses to the base of the exposure". The floor or base of the retrogressive thaw slump is covered in then sediment—mudflows and braided hills. As the headscarp progressively retreats, the slump floor extends.

As the slopes thaw, the ice-rich permafrost is exposed and turns into a mud slurry.  Thermokarst processes may cause lakes to enlarge, peatlands to collapse and landslides or thaw slumps to develop." "Retrogressive thaw slumps are among the most active geomorphological features in permafrost terrain."

A 2009 study classified slumps as active, stable, and ancient. An active slump is one that has a clearly-defined headwall and bare areas; and a stable slump is one that has clearly-defined boundaries and is completely covered in vegetation. The headwall relief of an ancient slump is a subdued scar on the terrain that is covered in tundra vegetation.

Geomorphic terminology
RTS morphology comprises a vertical headwall, an inclined headscarp, a floor filled with flow deposits, and a lobe that conveys thawed sediments downslope. RTS morphology comprises the headwall, headscarp; a floor, and a lobe. The vertical headwall is steep and ice-rich; the downsloped headscarp is a "low-angled scar zone" composed of thawed slurry; the lobe is a tongue of debris in active slumps which is composed of saturated materials that flowed downslope.

Retrogressive thaw slumps are slope failures due to abrupt thawing of ice-rich permafrost. They have also been called ground-ice slumps, thermocirques, tundra mudflows, retrogressive flow slides, and bi-modal flows. These terms are no longer recommended by the National Snow and Ice Data Center (NSIDC). 

Yedoma are deposits of highly organic-rich and ice-rich permafrost with ice content representing from 50 to 90% of its volume. Much of the yedoma deposits have been frozen since 10,000 years ago, in the Pleistocene age. As of 2011, the Yedoma domain covered  of the northern permafrost zone, mostly in Siberia, including northern Yakutia, and also in Alaska, and in the north of Canada, including the Yukon Territories.

A retrogressive thaw slump is a slow landslide caused by thawing yedoma. Because yedoma deposits are ice-rich, they are "especially prone to rapid-thaw processes" and "highly vulnerable to disturbances such as thermokarst and thermo-erosion processes".

According to the definition of the Multi-Language Glossary of Permafrost and Related Ground-Ice Terms compiled by the International Permafrost Association (IPA)'s Terminology Working Group, "retrogressive thaw slumps consist of a steep headwall that retreats in a retrogressive fashion due to thawing, and a debris flow formed by the mixture of thawed sediment and meltwater that slides down the face of the headwall and flows away."

Geographic distribution
Retrogressive thaw slumps are forms of the permafrost or glaciated regions and may be found in the Northern Hemisphere and the Tibetan Plateau, from the Himalayas to northern Greenland, in northern Canada and Alaska. RTSs "are commonly found on the banks of northern rivers and lakes and along the arctic coast, especially where undercutting is active."

Alaska

Canada
There are thousands of RTSs have been inventoried in the north of Canada. There were 212 RTS, varying in size "from 0.4 to 52 ha, with 10 slumps exceeding 20 ha", identified in the westward extent of the Laurentide Ice Sheet in northwestern Canada's Richardson Mountains and Peel Plateau regionof these "189 have been active since at least 1985". These thaw slumps affect permafrost terrain in northwestern Canada, where thousands of them have been identified. 

Multi-year studies have mapped and monitored of RTSs in the Mackenzie River Delta since 1950. Researchers found a "significantly higher growth rates" of RTSs from 1973 to 2004 than from 1950 to 1973, which suggested that a "regional driver of slump growth has subsumed site specific controls."

China
Across the Tibetan Plateaualso known as the Qinghai–Tibet Plateau (QTP)the -long narrow engineering corridor on permafrostthe Qinghai-Tibet Engineering Corridor links Lhasa in inland China to the Golmud in the Tibet Autonomous Region. A 2022 inventory identified 875 widely distributed RTSs, along the highly developed corridor with significant infrastructures, including the Qinghai–Tibet Railway and the Qinghai–Tibet Highway, "as well as power and communication towers".

Russia

Two-thirds of Russia's territory consists of permafrost terrain—which represents that largest share in the world. It is here in central Yakutia in the East Siberian taiga in Verkhoyansky District of the Sakha Republic that the largest retrogressive thaw slump, the Batagaika Crater is located. The crater is a feature of a 'thermokarst depression'; in contrast to other thermokarst depressions in permafrost terrainincluding those found in the north of Canadathe Batagaika Crater is much deeper—from "two-to-three times deeper".

In 2016, University of Sussex's scientist and professor, Julian Murton, led an expedition to undertake a pilot study of the Batagaika Crater—"one of 'most important' sites in the world for the study of permafrost". The local residents living near the crater refer to it as a "gateway to Hell." The Yakutian people, believe that the crater is the door way to under world, one of three worlds, which include the upper and middle worlds.

The bottom layer of permafrost sediment has been estimated to be "at least six hundred and fifty thousand years old", based on luminescence dating of drill bores extracted by Murton and his team. Murton said that this means that the permafrost "survived the previous interglacial period, which began some hundred and thirty thousand years ago...The oldest permafrost in Eurasia has been kicking around for over half a million years...Seeing as it survived intense global-warming events in the past, it must be pretty resilient."

While permafrost is resilient, it is not invulnerable. Batagaika Crater began to form in the 1960s, following clear-cutting of a large forested area. It has been growing  a year since then. In 2008, there was major flooding in the area which accelerated to growth of the depression.

In 2016 and 2017, a group of researchers studied retrogressive thaw slumps in Northeast Siberia: one at Kurungnakh Island in the Lena River Delta and the second in Duvanny Yar near the Kolyma River. In 2018, an international team of scientists, found a nematode in a Pleistocene squirrel burrow in the Duvanny Yar outcrop that was estimated to be about 32,000 years old. The scientists thawed the nematodes; it revived and began moving and eating, making it one of the oldest living multicellular animals on Earth.

Mongolia
There is a pingo retrogressive thaw slump in the Akkol Valley, one of three U-shaped valleys—including Taldura and Karaoyuk—that comprise the Altai Mountains South Chuyskiy Range in Mongolia. During the Holocene, these three valleys were occupied by ice at various times. The Akkol valley permafrost-indicator features include rock glaciers, pingos.

Climate change
As the climate warms, "terrain-altering thermokarst" retrogressive thaw slumps represent the "most rapid and dramatic changes" in permafrost regions.

Of the estimated 950 billion tonnes of carbon in permafrost, the yedoma domain stores just a little less than 50% of this carbon.

RTS "represent a particularly dramatic landscape response that is expected to intensify in magnitude and frequency with future climate change." They "contribute large volumes of materials downslope to lakes, drainage networks and coastal zones."

Retrogressive thaw slumps development is one result of global warming as Arctic temperatures rise rapidly rise and permafrost thaws. For this reason, permafrost environments are extremely vulnerable to climate change in the Arctic.

Impact
RSTs thaw "hectares of permafrost annually." RTSs "typically retreat and expand at high rates". RTSs damage "infrastructure, and releas[e] carbon preserved in frozen ground."

Modification of streams and rivers
Thaw slumps "have been shown to modify the discharge of streams and rivers (Kokelj et al. 2013) and the geochemical composition and sediment loads of streams and lakes (Kokelj et al. 2009; Malone et al. 2013; Rudy et al. 2017; Tanski et al. 2017)

"This has negatively affected aquatic ecosystems, including benthic macroinvertebrates communities (Chin et al. 2016).

Potential consequences
Retrogressive thaw slumps threaten Canada's infrastructure and contributes to mercury contamination in the water.

in the western Canadian Arctic, Inuvialuit residents of the hamlet of Sachs Harbour, Banks Island reported seeing an increase in the number of slumps, which had affected "travel for traditional hunting and fishing activities."

RTS monitoring
"Advances in remote sensing techniques, and their application in a broad suite of change detection studies, indicate recent increases in the rates and magnitude of thermokarst including retrogressive thaw slumping, lake expansion and the transformation of frozen peatlands to collapsed wetlands."

In Canada, computerized alert systems are being installed to monitor humidity, temperature and other factors at RTSs that threaten infrastructure, such as the Alaska Highway. One of the first of these alert systems includes several in northern Quebec and one at the Takhini Slump. There are plans in place to set up systems along the Dempster Highway, in the Yukon Territories and the Northwest Territories.

A 2022 Earth System Science Data report described the implementation of a number of sensors and integrated observation dataset used to monitor the RSSs "hydrological and thermal deformation" to mitigate infrastructure damage to the Qinghai-Tibet Engineering Corridor engineering projects.

Mitigation
"[I]ncreased knowledge on the dynamics of thaw slump activity is required to better characterize their impact on the environment." According to a 1990 study, woodchip insulation on ice-rich slopes were used to slow down slumping along the "pipeline route from Norman Wells, NWT, to Zama, Alberta."

Notes

References

Sources

 
 
 
 
  
 
  
 
 
 
 
 
  
 
 
 
 
 
  
 
 
  
 
 
 
 
  
  
  
  
 
  
 
 
 
 
 
  
 
  
 
 
 
 
  
 
 
  
 

Periglacial landforms
Patterned grounds
Permafrost